The U21 Ligi is the reserve team league for the top Turkish association football teams in the Süper Lig and 1. Lig. The league is split into western and an eastern division.

History

The league started in 1989-1990 and was named TFF PAF Ligi (Profesyonelliğe Aday Futbolcular) until the 2008–09 season. The 1993–94 season was called TFF BAL Ligi (Deplasmanlı Bölgesel Altyapı Ligi). From 2009 till 2014 the league was called TFF A2 Ligi. Since the 2014–15 season the name has been U21 Ligi.

Teams are not relegated from the U21 Ligi based on their final league position, but on the league position of their respective clubs' senior teams. If a senior team is relegated from the 1. Lig, then the reserve team is relegated from the U21 Ligi and replaced by the reserve team of the promoted team from the 2. Lig.

Until 2009, only U21 teams of the Süper Lig could participate in the U21 Ligi. Since then, 1. Lig teams can participate and therefore the league is split into a western (20 teams) and eastern group (18 teams) and the winner of each group play a final match.

Past winners

Performance by club

See also
Football records in Turkey

External links 
Turkish Football Federation website

References
 Erdoğan Arıpınar; Tevfik Ünsi Artun, Cem Atabeyoğlu, Nurhan Aydın, Ergun Hiçyılmaz, Haluk San, Orhan Vedat Sevinçli, Vala Somalı (June 1992). Türk Futbol Tarihi (1991-1996) vol.3, Page(77), Türkiye Futbol Federasyonu Yayınları.

 
Football leagues in Turkey
Sports leagues established in 1989
1989 establishments in Turkey
Turk